Slobodan Trajković (Serbian Cyrillic: Слободан Трајковић; born 1954) is a Serbian visual artist. He began his career in the late 1970s. Lives in London and Belgrade.

Biography 

In the 1980s Slobodan Trajković rejected the academic language of the arts and began creating spatial works and installations belonging to the then current reversal art.

He later abandoned the idea of image-building, moving towards flat representation of color organized in a figurative and abstract mix, which tended to highly variable "chromatic aggression". For many years he lived in New York City where the school of abstract art is still an active inspiration.

He then moved to London and returned to the European tradition lacking in the New World. He again explored dialectics of form: organic-artificial, colorful-achromatic (or monochrome), rough-gentle, hard-fragile. He produces drawings, objects, sculptures, installations, two-dimensional and three-dimensional works in various materials.

Sources 

 Ivana Simeonović Ćelić: Muzej Zepter, Beograd, 2010, pp. 292–293. 
 Jovan Despotovic: Nova slika, Clio, Beograd, 2006, pp. 54, 99. 
 Ivana Simeonović Ćelić: Boje vremena, Clio, Belgrade, 2005
 The Marie Walsh Art Foundation: Artist to artist, Ace Gallery, New York, 2002. Library of Congress Control Number: 2002103699. 
 Ješa Denegri, Fragments of postmodern pluralism, CICERO, Belgrade, 1997, pp. 146–149
 Ješa Denegri: Eighties: Themes of Serbian Art, Svetovi, Novi Sad, 1997
 Robert C. Morgan: Paintings as an anatomical constellation, Stux Gallery, New York, September 1996, pp. 3,4,5 and 6. Library of Congress Control Card Number: 96-92417. .
 Vlado Buzancić, Rexhep Goci, Contemporary Kosovian Art, Art Gallery, Priština, 1988, pp. 12, 20, 40, 47, 140, 141.

References

External links 

 Slobodan Trajković website
 Florence Trust Art Foundation, London
 Ikona Gallery, Venezia
 Institute of Contemporary Art, Singapore
 Gallery  Beograd, Belgrade
 Gallery Remont, Belgrade
 Stux Gallery, New York

1954 births
Living people
Serbian contemporary artists
Artists from Pristina
Yugoslav emigrants to the United States
Serbian artists
Yugoslav emigrants to the United Kingdom